Scott Base is a New Zealand Antarctic research station at Pram Point on Ross Island near Mount Erebus in New Zealand's Ross Dependency territorial claim. It was named in honour of Captain Robert Falcon Scott, RN, leader of two British expeditions to the Ross Sea area of Antarctica. The base was set up as support to field research and the centre for research into earth sciences, and now conducts research in many fields, operated by Antarctica New Zealand.

History

Scott Base was originally constructed in support of the UK inspired and privately managed Commonwealth Trans-Antarctic Expedition (TAE). The New Zealand government provided support for the TAE and also for the International Geophysical Year (IGY) project of 1957, five of whose members were attached to the Expedition.  In February 1956, 10 months before the TAE and IGY parties were due to head to the Antarctic, Frank Ponder, an architect at the Ministry of Works (New Zealand), was given the task of designing the base. Ponder's design consisted of six main buildings and three smaller scientific labs. The main buildings were to be placed at least 7 metres apart because of fire risk but were linked to one another by a covered way of galvanised iron. Three New Zealand observers who were also given the task of selecting the site for a base went to McMurdo Sound with the United States "Operation Deep Freeze I" in the summer of 1955. After evaluating possible sites, a location near Butter Point was chosen.  This was later changed to Pram Point as it provided better access for offloading supplies from the Expedition ship HMNZS Endeavour and also allowed for the operation of the critical RNZAF Antarctic Flight on a nearby ice runway. The base looks out over what is now known as Haskell Strait. Scott Base passed over to New Zealand Government ownership via the Department of Scientific and Industrial Research (DSIR), on 5 March 1958, at the conclusion of the TAE.
  
During the IGY the United States facility at Hut Point did not operate as a scientific base. It was the New Zealand expedition’s responsibility to furnish the important scientific data (auroral, ionospheric, seismic, etc.), linking the McMurdo area research activities with those of the United States Pole Station and the joint United States–New Zealand station at Cape Hallett, Victoria Land.

Scientific research and expansion
In 1958, following completion of the TAE and IGY, New Zealand made the decision to continue to operate Scott Base for scientific research, much of which depends upon the continuity of recorded data over a period of years.  In order to maintain operations, a base rebuilding programme began in 1976. As of 2008, the only original building is the TAE 'A' mess hut, which contains material recording New Zealand's involvement in Antarctica since 1957. In 2005 the two-story high Hillary Field Centre was commissioned, increasing the floor area of Scott Base by 1800 square metres and providing work areas to support field parties as well as additional office space. The building was officially opened by then-Foreign Minister Phil Goff and Sir Edmund Hillary.

The leader of Scott Base for the 1964–65 season, Adrian Hayter, published a personal memoir of his experience. He was preceded as Leader by Russell Rawle and followed by Mike Prebble. These three leaders are commemorated with Rawle Glacier, Mount Hayter and Prebble Glacier, assuming the leader in 1965–66 was on the base support party of 1961–62.

From 1957 until 1986, dogs played a part in base operations. Initially, they were an essential means of transport, but with better technology, their importance dwindled until they were removed in line with environmental treaties.

Scientific diving operations began in 1985. Between 1985 and 2006, a total of 1,296 had been logged.

21st century redevelopment
In support of the future of New Zealand’s Antarctic science programme, the base will be redeveloped. In June 2019 the Government committed NZ$18.5 million (US$12.4 million) for the next phase of the Scott Base Redevelopment project, which will see the base's 12 separate buildings replaced by three large interconnected buildings. Jasmax and Hugh Broughton Architects came up with the architectural design. Since then the New Zealand Government has committed $344 million to rebuild the base.

On 5 November 2021, Antarctica New Zealand confirmed that PrimePort Timaru will host the redevelopment of the prefabricated Scott Base facilities. Besides the three interconnected buildings, the project also involves upgrading the Ross Island wind farm. The redevelopment project will create an estimated 700 jobs over the next six years.

Historic site
The A Hut of Scott Base is the only existing Commonwealth Trans-Antarctic Expedition (1956–1957) building in Antarctica. It has been designated a Historic Site or Monument (HSM 75), following a proposal by New Zealand to the Antarctic Treaty Consultative Meeting.

Facilities

The base is made up of a collection of Chelsea Cucumber green buildings which are linked by all-weather corridors.  These buildings can accommodate 86 people over summer, with a "skeleton staff" of between 10 and 14 people remaining over the winter.

Spark NZ also provide phone services to McMurdo for calls to New Zealand as well as to the Italian Programme at Terra Nova Bay. McMurdo Station has an independent communications infrastructure located at Black Island and linked to Ross Island via microwave.

Scott Base is today operated by Antarctica New Zealand.

Climate

A polar ice cap climate with evenly-distributed precipitation (Köppen EFf) prevails at Scott Base. It is exposed to the full strength of southerly blizzards, although overall it is less windy than McMurdo Station.

See also

 List of Antarctic expeditions
 List of Antarctic research stations
 List of Antarctic field camps
 Marble Point
 Castle Rock (Antarctica)
 Ross Ice Shelf
 The Antarctic Sun
 Williams Field
 Crime in Antarctica

References

External links
 Antarctica New Zealand homepage
 Scott base homepage
 Antarctic connection page
 Current weather at Scott Base
 Current webcam at Scott Base
 Images & Articles about Antarctica from New Zealand Defence Force
 COMNAP Antarctic Facilities
 COMNAP Antarctic Facilities Map
Scott Base 50th Anniversary Website
  Scott Base 50th Anniversary Website
 Photos of Prime Minister's visit
 50th Anniversary stamp issue

NZ Antarctic Research
   Latitudinal Gradient Project (LGP) supporting scientists in investigations related to the broad theme of ecosystems research
  ANDRILL - Drilling back into the future

 
Outposts of the Ross Dependency
Historic Sites and Monuments of Antarctica
1957 establishments in Antarctica